The 2011 Murray State Racers football team represented Murray State University in the 2011 NCAA Division I FCS football season. The Racers were led by second-year head coach Chris Hatcher and played their home games at Roy Stewart Stadium. They are a member of the Ohio Valley Conference. They finished the season 7–4, 5–3 in OVC play to finish in fourth place. Average home attendance for the 2011 season was 5,642.

Schedule

References

Murray State
Murray State Racers football seasons
Murray State Racers football